Heywood Island may refer to:

 Heywood Island (Antarctica) in the South Shetland Islands group
 Heywood Island (Western Australia) off the Kimberley coast